Results for squash at the 2003 Games of the Small States of Europe.

Men's Team 
Each team received a point for each game won and 5 for each match won.

Women's Team 
Each team received a point for each game won and 5 for each match won.

References

2003 in squash
2003 Games of the Small States of Europe
2003